James Isaac Good (1850–1924) was an American Reformed church clergyman and historian.

Life
He was born at York, Pennsylvania on December 31, 1850. He graduated at Lafayette College in 1872 and at Union Theological Seminary in 1875. For thirty years (1875-1905), his pastorates were in Pennsylvania. Later, he held a position at the Central Theological Seminary (Dayton, Ohio), and was elected president of the General Synod of the Reformed Church in the United States.

He died in Philadelphia on January 22, 1924.

Works
Life Pictures of John Calvin for Young and Old, with George R. Richards (1909)
 The Origin of the Reformed Church in Germany (new edition, 1913) 
 Life of Rev. Benjamin Schneider, D. D., a Missionary of the reformed Church in the United States through the American Board at Broosa and Aitab, Turkey, 1834-1877. [1915]
 The History of the Reformed Church in Germany (1894)  
 Rambles Around Reformed Lands; History of the Reformed Church in the United States (1899)  
 Famous Places of the Reformed Churches (1910)  
 History of the Reformed Church in the United States in the Nineteenth Century (1911)  
 History of the Swiss Reformed Church since the Reformation (1913)  
 The Heidelberg Confession in its Newest Light'' (1914)

References

External links
 

American Christian clergy
Historians from Pennsylvania
Lafayette College alumni
1850 births
1924 deaths
Writers from York, Pennsylvania
Writers from Dayton, Ohio
Reformed Church in the United States ministers
Historians from Ohio